Aliabad (also Romanized as ‘Alīābād) is a village in Karizan Rural District, Nasrabad District, Torbat-e Jam County, Razavi Khorasan Province, Iran. At the 2006 census, its population was 640, with 148 families.

See also 

 List of cities, towns and villages in Razavi Khorasan Province

References 

Populated places in Torbat-e Jam County